Jungnyeong is a mountain pass in the Sobaek Mountains of central South Korea. It stands on the flank of Sobaeksan, which reaches more than twice that height.

The pass connects Punggi-eup, Yeongju, Gyeongsangbuk-do with Danyang County in Chungcheongbuk-do.  Although today it is little more than a tourist attraction, in past ages it played a key role in connecting the eastern and western regions of the Korean peninsula.  Today the Jungang Line railroad passes underneath Jungnyeong; the tunnel is 4.5 kilometres long.

It was also of great religious significance.  During the early Silla period, the kings held spring and autumn rites here in honor of the mountain gods.  These practices continued into the Joseon Dynasty (1392-1910), when a temple to the mountain god was built here, known as "Jungnyeongsa."  In addition, the area was used as a location for Buddhist worship; as Buddhism took root in Silla in the seventh century, the temples of Buseoksa, Choamsa and Huibangsa were built.

Jungnyeong is also sometimes called by the pure Korean name daejae (대재).  Both names mean "Bamboo Pass."

See also
Geography of South Korea
Mountains of Korea
Korean Shamanism
Baekdudaegan

References
 
 

Landforms of North Chungcheong Province
Danyang County
Landforms of North Gyeongsang Province
Yeongju
Mountain passes of South Korea
Sobaek Mountains